Mount Tantalus is a  mountain in southwestern British Columbia, Canada, located  southeast of Falk Lake and  south of Monmouth Mountain. It is the highest mountain in the Tantalus Range of the Pacific Ranges and is famous for its snow-covered face.

Climate

Based on the Köppen climate classification, Mount Tantalus is located in the marine west coast climate zone of western North America. Most weather fronts originate in the Pacific Ocean, and travel east toward the Coast Mountains where they are forced upward by the range (Orographic lift), causing them to drop their moisture in the form of rain or snowfall. As a result, the Coast Mountains experience high precipitation, especially during the winter months in the form of snowfall.

See also

 Mount Dione
 Geography of British Columbia
 Geology of British Columbia

References

External links
 
 Mt. Tantalus photo: Flickr

Two-thousanders of British Columbia
Pacific Ranges
New Westminster Land District